Ari Sirka (Aymara ari pointed, sharp, sirka vein of the body or a mine, "pointed vein", also spelled Arisirka) is a mountain in the western extensions of the Cordillera Real in the Andes of Bolivia which reaches a height of approximately . It is located in the La Paz Department, Los Andes Province, Batallas Municipality. It lies at the Lawrawani Lake.

References 

Mountains of La Paz Department (Bolivia)